Otto Basler (8 May 1892 in Kitzingen, Bavaria – 28 May 1975 in Freiburg im Breigau) was a German philologist.

Basler studied German, Romance studies, English and history at the University of Freiburg.  In World War I, he was a reserve officer.  After his graduation, he was a librarian at the University of Freiburg until 1936, when he became the librarian  at the German army library from 1936–1945 in Berlin. In 1943, he started teaching at the University of Munich, first with a training order for German philology and folklore, and in 1947, he became a professor at the university. From 1952 to his retirement, he taught at Freiburg University.  He left Freiburg im Breisgau, where he taught since 1952 as a fee professor to 1959.  Basler was involved in  the German orthography reform of 1944. After the end of the World War II, he published his proposals for a spelling reform in his Leibniz publishing house.

References

Further reading
 Wolfgang Kopke: Spelling and constitutional reform, Tübingen: Mohr, 1995
 Theodor Ickler: The only real spelling reform in Germany, in: Sueddeutsche Zeitung No. 129, 8 Juni 1998, S. 9 June 1998, p. 9
 Hanno Birken-Bertsch and Reinhard Markner: Rechtschreibreform und Nationalsozialismus. Ein Kapitel aus der politischen Geschichte der deutschen Sprache, Göttingen: Wallstein, 2000. 

1892 births
1975 deaths
Germanists
German philologists
People from Kitzingen
German orthography
20th-century philologists